Margaret Ritchie (1903 – 1969) was an English soprano who sang opera, oratorio and song. She created a number of operatic roles. In 1946 she was the first Lucia in The Rape of Lucretia by Benjamin Britten, and in 1947 she was the first Miss Wordsworth in the same composer's Albert Herring.

She was one of four singers, together with Elisabeth Schwarzkopf, Oda Slobodskaya and Tatiana Makushina, to record a selection of Nikolai Medtner's songs accompanied by the composer: theirs was the premier recording of the Sonata-Vocalise Op. 41 No. 1, which is introduced by a setting of the poem "Geweihter Platz" by Goethe.

Her discography includes, in addition to the two Britten operas mentioned above, Elmira in George Frideric Handel's Sosarme conducted by Anthony Lewis (1954) and Galatea in Handel's Acis and Galatea conducted by Walter Goehr (1951). She recorded two solo recitals, both accompanied by George Malcolm on piano/harpsichord: one on the Nixa label includes art songs Henry Purcell, Henry Bishop, William Boyce, Thomas Arne, Wolfgang Amadeus Mozart, and Franz Schubert, and the other on the HMV label includes lieder of Schubert and Joseph Haydn.

She made one film in 1945, where she played the part of real-life singing star Adelina Patti. The film was Pink String and Sealing Wax.

References

1903 births
1969 deaths
English operatic sopranos
20th-century British women opera singers